The Pete Rozelle Radio-Television Award, created in 1989 and named for the late longtime NFL commissioner, Pete Rozelle, is bestowed annually by the Pro Football Hall of Fame "for longtime exceptional contributions to radio and television in professional football".  In contrast to similar awards given by the other American professional sports leagues, the Rozelle Award has occasionally been granted to broadcast executives and production people in addition to on-air personalities.

Rozelle Award recipients

References

See also
List of current National Football League broadcasters
Curt Gowdy Media Award - the NBA's comparable award
Ford C. Frick Award - MLB's comparable award
Foster Hewitt Memorial Award - the NHL's comparable award
Bill Nunn Award

Pro Football Hall of Fame
Sportscasting awards
American football trophies and awards
Awards established in 1989